Petrine Olgeirdottir (born 13 April 1994) is a Norwegian deaf snowboarder. 

She competed at the 2015 Winter Deaflympics and bagged a silver medal in the women's slopestyle event. She was just one of three participants to have represented Norway during the 2015 Winter Deaflympics and was the only medalist for Norway. Petrine also became the first Norwegian to win a medal in Winter Deaflympics since Norway's return to Winter Games since 2003. Prior to her achievement, retired veteran cross country skier Tone Tangen Myrvoll was the last Norwegian to claim a Winter Deaflympic medal.

References 

1994 births
Living people
Norwegian female snowboarders
Deaf sportspeople
Norwegian deaf people
Medalists at the 2015 Winter Deaflympics
Deaflympic silver medalists for Norway
21st-century Norwegian women